Jason Fowler studied ballet at the Dallas Ballet Center and entered the School of American Ballet in 1993. While there he danced selections from Balanchine's Agon, Cortège Hongrois, The Nutcracker and A Midsummer Night's Dream. Fowler became an apprentice with New York City Ballet in 1995, joined the corps de ballet in 1996 and was promoted to soloist in 2006.

Originated rôles

Mauro Bigonzetti 
Vespro
In Vento

Susan Stroman 
Double Feature, The Blue Necklace, Mr. Griffith

Christopher Wheeldon 
Polyphonia

Featured rôles

George Balanchine 

Agon
Chaconne
Divertimento No. 15
The Nutcracker
Hot Chocolate
Host
A Midsummer Night's Dream
Titania's Cavalier
Demetrius
Theseus
Scotch Symphony
Slaughter on Tenth Avenue
Union Jack
La Valse
Vienna Waltzes

Boris Eifman 

Musagète

Peter Martins 

The Sleeping Beauty European tour
Swan Lake
Hungarian
Russian
Spanish

Jerome Robbins 

The Four Seasons
Janus
Glass Pieces
The Goldberg Variations

Christopher Wheeldon 

After The Rain

Reviews 

  
NY Times, Jennifer Dunning June 18, 2002
 
NY Times, Jennifer Dunning January 28, 2008

Living people
American male ballet dancers
New York City Ballet soloists
School of American Ballet alumni
Year of birth missing (living people)